The Da Ali G Show is a satirical television series created by Sacha Baron Cohen that aired for three 6–episode seasons. In the series, Baron Cohen plays three unorthodox journalists: Ali G, Borat Sagdiyev and Brüno Gehard. The first season took place in the UK and aired on Channel 4 from 30 March 2000, to 5 May 2000, while the second and third seasons took place in the US and aired on HBO from 21 February 2003, to 22 August 2004, and are known as Ali G in da USAiii in countries the original season aired in. All three seasons are available on DVD. Four spin-off films: Ali G Indahouse, Borat: Cultural Learnings of America for Make Benefit Glorious Nation of Kazakhstan, Brüno and Borat Subsequent Moviefilm: Delivery of Prodigious Bribe to American Regime for Make Benefit Once Glorious Nation of Kazakhstan have also been released. The show was a critical success and received a number of awards and nominations.

Series overview

Episodes

Season 1 (2000)

Season 2 (2003)

Season 3 (2004)

See also
List of Da Ali G Show DVD releases
Ali G Indahouse (2002)
Borat (2006)
Brüno (2009)

References

External links
 List of Da Ali G Show (US) episodes at HBO's official site
 
 
 
 

Episodes
Lists of British comedy television series episodes